Tuğay (also, Tağay, Tagai, Tagay, Tagiya, and Toğay) is a village and municipality in the Siazan Rayon of Azerbaijan.  It has a population of 374.

References 

Populated places in Siyazan District